Taramon Bibi Bir Protik ( – 1 December 2018) was one of the two female freedom fighters in Bangladesh obtaining the Bir Protik award. She engaged in direct combat during the liberation war of Bangladesh in 1971 as a member of the Mukti Bahini (Liberation Army) which was a guerrilla force that fought against the Pakistan military.

Biography
Bibi was born in Shankar Madhabpur village, Kurigram District to Abdus Sobhan and Kulsum Bewa. She was hired by the Mukti Bahini as a help cook and clean the camp when she was 16. She was interested in the war effort and asked Havildar Muhit in infantry regiment of Sector 11 to train. He trained her on the usage of .303 British rifle and submachine guns. She was in Sector 11 under the leadership of sector commander Abu Taher.

Taramon Bibi died at her residence at Char Rajibpur Upazila, Kurigram, at 1:30am on 1 December 2018.

Award
After the war, she was awarded Bir Protik (Symbol of Valour) by Bangladesh government in 1973. But her whereabouts were unknown and the award was never handed over to her. She herself remained unaware of this until 1995 when a researcher from Mymensingh discovered her. She was finally given her award by then Prime Minister of Bangladesh Khaleda Zia on 19 December 1995.

Personal life
Bibi was married to Abdul Majid. Together they had a son, Abu Taher, and a daughter.

References

1950s births
2018 deaths
People from Kurigram District
Women in war in Bangladesh
Recipients of the Bir Protik
Women in warfare post-1945
Bangladeshi women activists
Mukti Bahini personnel
Date of birth missing